Little Jack is a mountain in Washington state.

Little Jack may also refer to:

 Little Jack Horner, a children's nursery rhyme
 Little Jack Sheppard, a burlesque play
 Little Jack, an airship in the video game Skies of Arcadia